Ilmārs Bricis (born 9 July 1970) is a former Latvian biathlete, who has participated in six Winter Olympics from 1992 to 2010.

He is now a biathlon coach. Bricis currently coaches Baiba Bendika and Tomas Kaukenas.

Personal life
He was married to three-time Olympian Anžela Brice (cross-country skiing 1998, biathlon 2002 and 2006). Their eighteen-year-old daughter Anete Brice, coached by Anžela, competed in cross-country skiing at the 2010 Winter Olympics.

His hobbies are music and driving.

Career
Bricis has won bronze medals in 20 km race at the 2001 World Championship in Pokljuka and in 10 km sprint at the 2005 World Championship in Hochfilzen.

He came 5th in the 20km and sixth in the 4 x 7.5 km Relay at the 1998 Olympics in Nagano. His best performance was fourth at the 12.5km Pursuit at the 2006 Olympics in Torino.

At the 2010 Winter Olympics in Vancouver, he and luger Anna Orlova both competed in their sixth Olympic Games. They are the first Latvians to do so, after eight-time Olympian shooter Afanasijs Kuzmins at the Summer Olympics.

Bricis is the 4th biathlete to compete at six Winter Olympics, after Austrian Alfred Eder, Briton Michael Dixon and Russian Sergei Tchepikov, with Norwegian Ole Einar Bjørndalen following in 2014.

Biathlon results
All results are sourced from the International Biathlon Union.

Olympic Games

*Pursuit was added as an event in 2002, with mass start being added in 2006.

World Championships
2 medals (2 bronze)

*During Olympic seasons competitions are only held for those events not included in the Olympic program.
**Team was removed as an event in 1998, and pursuit was added in 1997 with mass start being added in 1999 and the mixed relay in 2005.

See also 
 List of athletes with the most appearances at Olympic Games

References

External links
 
 
 
 
 

1970 births
Living people
Sportspeople from Riga
Latvian male biathletes
Biathletes at the 1992 Winter Olympics
Biathletes at the 1994 Winter Olympics
Biathletes at the 1998 Winter Olympics
Biathletes at the 2002 Winter Olympics
Biathletes at the 2006 Winter Olympics
Biathletes at the 2010 Winter Olympics
Olympic biathletes of Latvia
Biathlon World Championships medalists